Jacques Toubon (born 29 June 1941) is a right-wing French politician who held several major national and Parisian offices. He has been serving as Defender of Rights (Ombudsman) between 2014 and 2020.

Political career

Governmental functions

Minister of Culture : 1993–1995.

Keeper of the Seals, Minister of Justice : 1995–1997.

Electoral mandates

European Parliament

Member of European Parliament : 2004–2009. Elected in 2004.

National Assembly of France

Member of the National Assembly for Paris : 1981–1993 (Became minister in 1993). Elected in 1981, reelected in 1986, 1988, 1993.

Municipal Council

Deputy-mayor of Paris : 1983–2001. Reelected in 1989, 1995.

Councillor of Paris : 1983–2008. Reelected in 1989, 1995, 2001.

Mayor of the 13th arrondissement of Paris : 1983–2001. Reelected in 1989, 1995.

Councillor of the 13th arrondissement of Paris : 1983–2001. Reelected in 1989, 1995.

Controversial actions
Jacques Toubon is known for the controversial so-called Toubon Law, enforcing the use of the French language in official French government publications, and advertisements published in France. Since the law can largely be described as being hostile to English, Jacques Toubon is sometimes referred to, jokingly, as "Mr Allgood" ("All Good" being a translation of "Tout bon").

Jacques Toubon is also remembered for the "helicopter affair". In 1996, an initial criminal enquiry had been opened by Laurent Davenas, then head prosecutor of Évry for alleged misuse of government funds, in which Xavière Tiberi, wife of then mayor of Paris Jean Tiberi (from Toubon's party) was involved. (See corruption scandals in the Paris region). However, this was not a full criminal investigation and no investigative magistrate had been named. Davenas then went on vacation in the Himalaya. His deputy then announced his decision to open a full investigation. The Rally for the Republic leaders were frightened by the possible implications of such an investigation, and Jacques Toubon, then minister of justice, famously hired a helicopter to fetch the mountaineering prosecutor and convince him to rein in his deputy (Davenas refused). 

Jacques Toubon has been the topic of much lampooning. In addition to "Mr Allgood", Les Guignols de l'info have referred to him as "M. Bouffon" ("Mr Buffoon").

Personal life
He was married to art expert Lise Toubon.

References

External links
 Former official page as Minister of Justice

1941 births
Living people
People from Nice
Politicians from Provence-Alpes-Côte d'Azur
MEPs for Île-de-France 2004–2009
French Ministers of Justice
French Ministers of Culture
Ombudsmen in France
École nationale d'administration alumni
Rally for the Republic politicians
Union for a Popular Movement MEPs
Commandeurs of the Ordre des Arts et des Lettres
Officers of the Ordre national du Mérite
Officiers of the Légion d'honneur
Mayors of arrondissements of Paris